B.B. King & Friends: 80 is the forty-first album by B.B. King released in 2005. Recorded in several studios, it celebrates King's 80th birthday and features duets with a variety of musicians.  80 reached No. 45 in the Billboard 200 top albums chart as well as No. 1 in the blues albums chart.

Grammy Awards 
The album won the Grammy Award for Best Traditional Blues Album at the 48th Annual Grammy Awards on February 8, 2006.

Track listing

Personnel
B.B. King – vocals, guitar
Van Morrison – vocals, harmonica (1)
Billy F Gibbons - guitar, vocal (2)
Eric Clapton - guitar (3)
Sheryl Crow - vocals (4)
Billy Ward - drums (9)
Ian Thomas – drums (1, 3, 7, 10)
Clem Clempson – guitar (10) 
John Mahon – percussion (12)
Leland Sklar – bass guitar (2, 4, 8, 11)
Robbie Buchanan – keyboards, Hammond organ (2, 4, 8, 11)
Mark Knopfler – guitar 
Bob Birch – bass guitar (12)
Jerry Hey – trumpet
Nathaniel Kunkel – shaker
Bill Reichenbach Jr. – trumpet
Brian Mitchell – keyboards (9)
John Mayer – vocals, guitar
Nigel Olsson – drums (12)
Brandon Fields – saxophone
Gary Grant – trumpet
Glenn Frey – vocals, guitar (tr.8)
T-Bone Wolk – bass guitar (9) 
Guy Babylon – keyboards
Davey Johnstone – guitar (12)
Russ Kunkel – drums (2, 4, 8, 11)
Luke Smith – Hammond organ (3)
Yolanda Charles – bass guitar (1, 3, 7, 10)
Dean Parks – rhythm guitar (8)
Elton John – vocals, piano (12)
Larry Campbell – (bass?) guitar (5, 6, 9)
 Chris Stainton - keyboards (10)

Studios 
Avatar Studios, New York City
Caesar's Palace Showroom, Las Vegas, Nevada
Conway Recording Studios, Los Angeles
O'Henry Studios, Burbank, California
Ocean Way Recording
Olympic Studios, London
Right Track Recording, New York City

Notes and references 

2005 albums
B.B. King albums
Geffen Records albums
Vocal duet albums